Amédée Grab (3 February 1930 – 19 May 2019) was a Swiss Roman Catholic bishop.

Grab was born in Switzerland and was ordained to the priesthood in 1954. He served as titular bishop of Canæ and auxiliary bishop of the Roman Catholic Diocese of Lausanne, Geneva and Fribourg, Switzerland, from 1987 to 1995. Grab then served as bishop of the diocese from 1995 to 1998. He then served as bishop of the Roman Catholic Diocese of Chur from 1998 to 2007.

References

External links

1930 births
2019 deaths
Bishops of Chur
21st-century Roman Catholic bishops in Switzerland
20th-century Roman Catholic bishops in Switzerland